Zeppelin LZ 95 (L 48) was a U-class zeppelin of the Imperial German Military.

Career 

One successful reconnaissance mission.

Destruction

L 48 joined attempted attack on London with 4 other Zeppelins, L 42, L 44, L 45 and L 47. Commanded by George Eichler, on his thirteenth raid, it became lost and was intercepted and destroyed by Royal Aircraft Factory B.E.12, serial No. 6110, flown by Canadian pilot Second Lieutenant Loudon Pierce Watkins.  He was attached to No. 37 Squadron of British Royal Flying Corps (RFC) fighters. Watkins enlisted with his three brothers. He had been based in the UK, as home defence, since 11 December 1916. Watkins shot down L 48 over water near Great Yarmouth on 17 June 1917 but it crashed near Theberton, Suffolk, a village near the town of Leiston. Three survivors; crew buried at Theberton, later to be exhumed and reburied at Cannock Chase.

Of the seven Zeppelins lost over England that were shot down in 1917 during the First World War, L 48 was the only one shot down by the RFC's Home defence.

Specifications (LZ 95 / Type u zeppelin)

See also

List of Zeppelins

Bibliography
Notes

References 
 - Total pages: 464
 
 - Total pages: 160 
 - Total pages: 192

External links
 Account with excavation report
 BBC account
 Aerial photo on New Zealand government history site

Airships of Germany
Hydrogen airships
Zeppelins
Aviation accidents and incidents in 1917
Accidents and incidents involving balloons and airships